Middle Valley is a census-designated place (CDP) in Hamilton County, Tennessee, United States. The population was 11,695 at the 2020 census. It is part of the Chattanooga, TN–GA Metropolitan Statistical Area.

Geography
Middle Valley is located at  (35.189120, -85.191060).

Demographics

2020 census

As of the 2020 United States census, there were 11,695 people, 4,362 households, and 3,413 families residing in the CDP.

2000 census
As of the census of 2000, there were 11,854 people, 4,294 households, and 3,572 families residing in the CDP. The racial makeup of the CDP was 95.90% White, 1.87% African American, 0.27% Native American, 1.04% Asian, 0.03% Pacific Islander, 0.26% from other races, and 0.63% from two or more races. Hispanic or Latino of any race were 0.80% of the population.

There were 4,294 households, out of which 37.5% had children under the age of 18 living with them, 70.7% were married couples living together, 9.4% had a female householder with no husband present, and 16.8% were non-families. 14.3% of all households were made up of individuals, and 5.3% had someone living alone who was 65 years of age or older. The average household size was 2.76 and the average family size was 3.04.

In the CDP, the population was spread out, with 25.7% under the age of 18, 7.5% from 18 to 24, 29.4% from 25 to 44, 27.9% from 45 to 64, and 9.5% who were 65 years of age or older. The median age was 38 years. For every 100 females, there were 95.4 males. For every 100 females age 18 and over, there were 92.3 males.

The median income for a household in the CDP was $52,534, and the median income for a family was $57,596. Males had a median income of $39,802 versus $26,313 for females. The per capita income for the CDP was $22,151. About 4.6% of families and 5.4% of the population were below the poverty line, including 6.5% of those under age 18 and 8.9% of those age 65 or over.

Education
Middle Valley has three schools:
Middle Valley Elementary
McConnell Elementary (Lakesite, TN) 
Loftis Middle School (Lakesite, TN)

References

Census-designated places in Hamilton County, Tennessee
Census-designated places in Tennessee
Chattanooga metropolitan area
Tennessee populated places on the Tennessee River